Jean Germain Drouais (25 November 1763 – 13 February 1788), French historical painter, was born in Paris. His father, François-Hubert Drouais, and his grandfather, Hubert Drouais, were well-known portrait painters; it was from his father that he received his first artistic instruction.

Early years 
He was afterwards entrusted to the care of Brenet, an excellent teacher, though his own pictures did not take high rank. In 1780 Jacques-Louis David, who had just returned from Rome, opened a school of painting in Paris, and Drouais was one of his earliest and most promising pupils. He adopted the classical style of his master, giving his days to study painting and spending a great part of every night in designing. For weeks together it is said that he never left his studio.

Career 
In 1783 he was admitted to compete for the great prize of painting offered by the Academy, the subject being the Widow of Nain. After inspecting the works of his fellow-competitors, however, he lost hope and destroyed his own canvas, but was consoled by the assurance of his master David that he had not done badly, and would have won the prize. This was further revealed by the fact that no first prize was awarded in 1783 after his work was withdrawn. The next year he was triumphantly successful, the Woman of Canaan at the Feet of Christ, with which he gained the prize, being compared by competent critics with the works of Poussin. He was carried shoulder high by his fellow-students through the streets to his mother's house, and a place was afterward found for his picture in the Louvre. His success making him only the more eager to perfect himself in his art, he accompanied David to Rome, where he worked even more assiduously than in Paris. He was most strongly influenced by the remains of ancient art and by the works of Raphael. Goethe, who was at Rome at the time it was finished, has recorded the deep impression made by his Marius at Minturnae, which he characterizes as in some respects superior to the work of David, his master. The last picture that he completed was his Philoctetes on the Island of Lemnos.

Death 
Drouais died in 1788 in Rome. Following his death, a monument to his memory was erected by his fellow-students in the church of Santa Maria in the Via Lata.

References

1763 births
1788 deaths
18th-century French painters
French male painters
French portrait painters
Prix de Rome for painting
Pupils of Jacques-Louis David
18th-century French male artists